Charles Tyler Trowbridge (January 10, 1835 – December 24, 1907) was an American politician from New York. He was the first organizer and commander of black soldiers in the American Civil War.

Life 
Trowbridge was born on January 10, 1835, in Morris Plains, New Jersey, the son of Elijah Freeman Trowbridge and Temperance Ludlow Muchmore.

In 1854, Trowbridge moved to Brooklyn with his parents. He worked as an apprentice for a mason and builder. Shortly after finishing his apprenticeship, he went to the building business until the start of the Civil War.

Trowbridge enlisted in the 1st New York Volunteer Engineer Regiment in December 1861, and was mustered in as a sergeant in Company F. He served as an orderly for General David Hunter and went with the regiment to the coast of South Carolina. There, he began drilling the slaves that came to the camp as refugees. In May 1862, he was made captain of a provisional organization, the First South Carolina Volunteer Infantry. The unit was disbanded in August due to pressure from President Abraham Lincoln and the War Department, since the policy at the time didn't allow for black soldiers. The regiment was reorganized in November, with Trowbridge as captain of Company A, where his brother John Augustine also served. In 1863, he was promoted to major. In 1864, he took command of the regiment and was promoted to lieutenant colonel. The unit by then was known as the 33rd United States Colored Infantry Regiment. He fought in the Siege of Morris Island and the capture of Charleston. He was popular with his troops and gave regular speeches on the equality of races. He was the first person to organize and command black troops during the Civil War, but Colonel Shaw's unit was the first to be formally mustered in.

After the War, he returned to Brooklyn. In 1872, he was elected alderman. In 1874, he was re-elected alderman and elected town supervisor. In the 1876 New York state election, he was the Republican candidate for New York State Prison Inspector. In 1878, he was elected to the New York State Assembly as a Republican, representing the Kings County 4th District. He served in the Assembly in 1879. In 1882, he moved to Minneapolis and worked as a contracting brick mason. In 1901, he was appointed custodian of the old Minnesota State Capitol, where he lived for the rest of his life.

In 1857, Trowbridge married Emeline Haviland Jackson. They had one daughter, Ida Emeline. Emeline died in 1858. In 1861, he married Jane Pooler Martin. Their children were Jennie Elizabeth, Annie Elford, Charles Henry, and Josephine Temperance. He was a member of the Grand Army of the Republic and the Military Order of the Loyal Legion of the United States.

Trowbridge died in his room in the old Minnesota State Capitol on December 24, 1907. He was buried in Lakewood Cemetery.

References

External links 
 The Political Graveyard
 

1835 births
1907 deaths
People from Morris Plains, New Jersey
Politicians from Brooklyn
American bricklayers
People of New York (state) in the American Civil War
Military personnel from New York City
Union Army officers
New York City Council members
County legislators in New York (state)
19th-century American politicians
Republican Party members of the New York State Assembly
People from Minneapolis
Burials at Lakewood Cemetery
Military personnel from New Jersey